Theodore Jay Joyce is a professor of economics and finance at Baruch College and also at CUNY Graduate Center He is a research associate at the National Bureau of Economic Research.

Education
Joyce received his B.A. from the University of Massachusetts Amherst in education in 1976 and his Ph.D. in economics from the CUNY Graduate Center in 1985.

Research
Joyce conducts research in the fields of health economics and health policy. For example, he has published multiple studies on the effects of abortion laws. These include a 2011 perspective piece comparing the effectiveness of supply-side and demand-side laws in reducing rates of abortions performed after 16 weeks which found that the former were much more effective than the latter. He has also published research showing that parental involvement laws were not associated with significant changes in the overall abortion rate, but that they had small effects on some subgroups of minors. In a 2006 study, he and his colleagues found that Texas' parental notification law was associated with a significant decline in the abortion rate among Texas teenagers.

Awards
In 2005, Joyce became the first recipient of the Sidney Lirtzman Award for Excellence in Research, Teaching & Service.

References

External links

Year of birth missing (living people)
Living people
Baruch College faculty
21st-century American economists
Health economists
University of Massachusetts Amherst College of Education alumni
Graduate Center, CUNY alumni